The 2020 GT Sports Club Europe is the sixth season of the SRO Motorsports Group's GT Sports Club, an auto racing series for grand tourer cars. The GT Sports Club is a championship for Bronze level drivers only, with two additional sub-classes based on age, Titanium and Iron, in order to separate the potential of using higher-level drivers who are often in amateur classes based on their age. The Titanium categorisation for drivers between the age of 50 and 59. The Iron categorisation for drivers over the age of 60 (meaning all drivers who would be FIA Platinum or Gold but are 60 or older).

Calendar
An initial calendar was released on 28 September at an SRO Motorsports Group press conference ahead of the 2019 Barcelona 3 Hours. Which was later optimised so that GT2 and GT3 cars would run in the same races rather than having split championships Subsequently, due to the spread of COVID-19 in Italy, SRO Motorsports Group cancelled the Monza round and replaced it with a round at Imola, while the round at Misano was also removed. The COVID-19 pandemic subsequently necessitated a revised calendar being released.

Entry List

Race results

References

External links 
 Official website

GT Sports Club Europe
GT Sports Club Europe